The Sunderland of Scotland Masters was a golf tournament that was played from 1985 to 2002. It was a 72-hole stroke-play event on the "Tartan Tour", the PGA in Scotland's schedule. The event was initially played at Drumpellier but from 1991 a number of different Scottish venue were used.

Winners

The first Monklands Masters was held at Drumpellier in 1984 as an 18-hole pro-am and was won by Russell Weir. The 2000, 2001 and 2002 events were reduced to 54 holes by bad weather.

References

Golf tournaments in Scotland
Recurring sporting events established in 1985
Recurring sporting events disestablished in 2002
1985 establishments in Scotland
2002 disestablishments in Scotland